U.S. Cavalry was a worldwide distributor headquartered in Radcliff, Kentucky, USA, that provided duty and service equipment for the military, law enforcement, and homeland security communities. U.S. Cavalry delivered clothing, gear, and supplies and outdoor equipment. The company made its money through managed accounts, retail stores, mail order catalogs and the product website.

The company was founded in 1973 by Randy Acton.

U.S. Cavalry filed for bankruptcy in 2013 and was purchased by Aegis Brand Group, a privately owned facilities services company headquartered in Tennessee.

After struggling to restore the brand, ERMC, under the parent company Aegis Brand Group, sold U.S. Cavalry and USCAV's assets to Galls LLC in March 2016.

References

External links
 Galls (Official Website)
 wcuniforms (Official Website)

American companies disestablished in 2016
Companies based in Kentucky
Hardin County, Kentucky
1973 establishments in Kentucky 
Retail companies disestablished in 2016
Retail companies established in 1973
2016 disestablishments in Kentucky
American companies established in 1973